The 2022 Israeli Basketball League Cup, for sponsorships reasons the Winner League Cup, is the 17th edition of the pre-season tournament of the Israeli Basketball Premier League. Eleven Israeli Premier League team's will participate except from Hapoel Haifa that will play in the FIBA Europe Cup Qualification in those days.

Bracket

First round

Quarterfinals

Semifinals

Final

References

2022
League Cup